Rampurhat Government Medical College and Hospital(RPHGMCH) is a full-fledged tertiary referral Government Medical college. It was established in the year 2018. The college imparts the degree Bachelor of Medicine and Surgery (MBBS). Nursing and para-medical courses are also offered. The college is affiliated to West Bengal University of Health Sciences and is recognised by the National Medical Commission. The hospital associated with the college is one of the largest hospitals in the Birbhum district. The selection to the college is done on the basis of merit through National Eligibility and Entrance Test. Yearly undergraduate student intake is 100 from the year 2019. The medical college is divided into two campuses, main campus beside SH 14(District Hospital, Super Speciality Hospital, Academic Block, Girls' Hostel, Boys' Hostel, Intern & PGT Hostels) and the other at Chowk Mandala (Boys' Hostel & Staff Quarters).

Courses
Rampurhat Government Medical College, West Bengal undertakes education and training of students for MBBS courses with intake of 100 students annually. B.Sc. nursing & paramedical courses are also being offered by this institution.

See also

References

External links 
 

Medical colleges in West Bengal
Universities and colleges in Birbhum district
Affiliates of West Bengal University of Health Sciences
Educational institutions established in 2019
2019 establishments in West Bengal